Porrogszentpál is a village in Somogy County, Hungary, where Somogy Slovenes live.

External links 
 Street map (Hungarian)

References 

Populated places in Somogy County
Hungarian Slovene communities in Somogy County